Klaus Bodenmüller (born 6 September 1962) is an Austrian former track and field athlete who competed in the shot put. He is Austria's best ever performer in the event and holds the Austrian records at  outdoors and  indoors.

A silver medal at the 1991 IAAF World Indoor Championships made him the first Austrian to win a medal at the competition. His victory at the 1990 European Athletics Indoor Championships was the first time an Austrian had won a European shot put medal of any colour. He won a further bronze medal at the 1992 European Athletics Indoor Championships. He was a two-time Olympian, having competed in 1988 and 1992 – he placed sixth in the latter year.

At national level, he won six indoor shot put titles and five outdoors between 1992 and 1993. He ranked within the top twenty in the world by performance in the 1987 and 1993 seasons.

Career

Early life
Born in Feldkirch, Vorarlberg, he began competing in athletics at a young age, when his mother took him to a sports club when he was nine years old. Initially interested in the javelin throw, he focused on the shot put instead, in which he was getting better results.

He gradually improved his performances over a number of years, clearing seventeen metres in 1983 and reaching beyond eighteen metres by 1985. At that point he began his military service for Austria, but an injury to the head in 1985 left him hospitalised and unable to continue with his training.

International and Olympic debut
It was in 1985 that he began working with Jean-Pierre Egger – a coach and two-time shot put Olympian for Switzerland. He became part of a training group with Werner Günthör, another Swiss shot putter. This marked the beginning of Bodenmüller, in his mid-twenties, competing at the elite level of the sport. The group began to produce results the following year. He won his first national title at the Austrian Indoor Championships at the start of the year. Both Bodenmüller and Günthör competed at the 1986 European Athletics Championships.

Bodenmüller improved further the next year, winning the first of his five national titles at the Austrian Athletics Championships. He was pushed on the success of Günthör, who won what would be the first of his three world titles in the sport. Bodenmüller ended the year with a second-place finish at the Athletissima meeting.

He was in lesser form in the 1988 season, failing to go beyond the twenty-metre mark. However, his best of the year –  – was enough for a consecutive fourth place at the 1988 European Athletics Indoor Championships. He made his Olympic debut that year at the 1988 Seoul Games and was eliminated in the qualifying round in 16th place. He had no major international outings in 1989, but did manage a bronze medal at the European Cup B-final with a throw of twenty metres.

European medals
This made him Austria's first European champion in the shot put and only the third Austrian man to win a gold medal at the indoor competition, after Andreas Berger and Dietmar Millonig. Outdoors, he consistently threw beyond nineteen metres that year, with highlights being fourth place at the Athletissima meet and a tenth-place finish at the 1990 European Athletics Championships.

The 1991 IAAF World Indoor Championships marked a high point for the Egger training group as Bodenmüller was the silver medallist with  behind Günthör. It marked the first time an Austrian won a medal of any colour at the IAAF World Indoor Championships. On the outdoor circuit Bodenmüller was second at Athletissima and fourth at the Weltklasse Zürich. His success continued into the 1992 season with a bronze medal at the 1992 European Athletics Indoor Championships.

Final years
He did not translate this form at the 1993 World Championships in Athletics, barely clearing eighteen metres in the qualifiers and being eliminated as the fourth worst performer. His training mate Werner Günthör went on to win the title with a throw nearly four metres better. He chose to make it his last season as a professional shot putter and decided to retire from athletics. That year he won his eleventh and final Austrian shot put title in any conditions at the national outdoor championships.

Following his retirement from sport, he studied computing at university and became a software engineer. Though no longer doing throws events, he kept up his interest in sport by taking part in local long-distance running events.

Personal bests
Shot put outdoor –  (1987) 
Shot put indoor –  (1990)

National titles
Austrian Athletics Championships: 1987, 1989, 1991, 1992, 1993 
Austrian Indoor Championships: 1986, 1987, 1988, 1990, 1991, 1992

International competitions

References

External links

Living people
1962 births
People from Feldkirch, Vorarlberg
Austrian male shot putters
World Athletics Championships athletes for Austria
Olympic athletes of Austria
Athletes (track and field) at the 1988 Summer Olympics
Athletes (track and field) at the 1992 Summer Olympics
Sportspeople from Vorarlberg